The 2002 United States Open Championship was the 102nd U.S. Open, held June 13–16 at the Black Course of Bethpage State Park in Farmingdale, New York, east of New York City on Long Island.   Tiger Woods was the champion at 277 (−3), three shots ahead of runner-up Phil Mickelson. It was Woods' second U.S. Open victory and eighth major championship win of his career.

For the first time in thirty years, the winner of the Masters also won the U.S. Open, for the first half of the grand slam. It was last accomplished by Jack Nicklaus in 1972, and also by Arnold Palmer (1960), Ben Hogan (1951, 1953), and Craig Wood (1941).

Nick Faldo and Hale Irwin were given special exemptions from the USGA to play in the event.

Course layout
Bethpage State Park - Black Course

Field
1. Last 10 U.S. Open Champions
Ernie Els (9,10,11,14,17), Retief Goosen (8,10,11,14,17), Lee Janzen, Steve Jones, Tom Kite (8), Corey Pavin, Tiger Woods (3,4,5,8,9,11,12,17)

2. Top two finishers in the 2001 U.S. Amateur
Bubba Dickerson and Robert Hamilton forfeiting their exemptions by turning professional.

3. Last five Masters Champions
José María Olazábal (11,17), Mark O'Meara (4), Vijay Singh (5,8,9,11,17)

4. Last five British Open Champions
David Duval (9,17), Paul Lawrie (10), Justin Leonard (9,17)

5. Last five PGA Champions
Davis Love III (8,9,17), David Toms (9,11,12,17)

6. The Players Champion
Craig Perks

7. The U.S. Senior Open Champion
Bruce Fleisher did not play.

8. Top 15 finishers and ties in the 2001 U.S. Open
Michael Allen, Paul Azinger (17), Mark Brooks, Ángel Cabrera (10,17), Stewart Cink (9,17), Sergio García (9,12,17), Matt Gogel, Rocco Mediate (17), Phil Mickelson (9,11,17), Kirk Triplett

9. Top 30 leaders on the 2001 PGA Tour official money list
Robert Allenby (17), Mark Calcavecchia (17), Chris DiMarco (11,17), Joe Durant (17), Bob Estes (12,17), Brad Faxon (17), Jim Furyk (17), Scott Hoch (12,17), Bernhard Langer (10,17), Tom Lehman (17), Frank Lickliter, Steve Lowery, Scott McCarron (17), Billy Mayfair, Kenny Perry (17), Jeff Sluman, Steve Stricker, Hal Sutton (17), Scott Verplank (17), Mike Weir (17)

10. Top 15 on the 2001 European Tour Order of Merit
Thomas Bjørn (17), Michael Campbell (17), Darren Clarke (17), Niclas Fasth (17), Pádraig Harrington (17), David Howell, Robert Karlsson, Paul McGinley (17), Colin Montgomerie (17), Adam Scott (17)

11. Top 10 on the PGA Tour official money list, as of May 26
Shigeki Maruyama (17), Nick Price (17)

12. Winners of multiple PGA Tour events from April 25, 2001 through the 2002 Kemper Insurance Open

13. Special exemptions selected by the USGA
Nick Faldo, Hale Irwin

14. Top 2 from the 2002 European Tour Order of Merit, as of May 27

15. Top 2 on the 2001 Japan Golf Tour, provided they are within the top 75 point leaders of the Official World Golf Rankings at that time
Toshimitsu Izawa (17), Shingo Katayama (17)

16. Top 2 on the 2001 PGA Tour of Australasia, provided they are within the top 75 point leaders of the Official World Golf Rankings at that time
Peter O'Malley, Craig Parry

17. Top 50 on the Official World Golf Rankings list, as of May 27
Billy Andrade, José Cóceres, John Cook, John Daly, Dudley Hart, Jerry Kelly, Matt Kuchar, Len Mattiace, Jesper Parnevik, Kevin Sutherland

Sectional qualifiers
Daly City, California: Ricky Barnes (a,L), Paul Goydos, Andy Miller (L)
Denver, Colorado: Ben Portie, Derek Tolan (a,L)
Tampa, Florida: John Huston, Greg Norman, Tony Soerries (L), Kevin Warrick (a,L)
Roswell, Georgia: Ken Duke (L), Thomas Levet, Scott Parel (L)
North Barrington, Illinois: Tom Gillis, Adam Speirs (L)
Rockville, Maryland: Stephen Ames, Stuart Appleby, Woody Austin, Jay Don Blake, Craig Bowden (L), Olin Browne, Greg Chalmers, Michael Clark II, Ben Crane, Luke Donald, Jim Gallagher Jr., Brian Gay, Brent Geiberger, Lucas Glover (L), Paul Gow, Jerry Haas (L), Steve Haskins, Donnie Hammond, Tim Herron, Charles Howell III, Kent Jones, Pete Jordan, Franklin Langham, Brad Lardon (L), Peter Lonard, Blaine McCallister, George McNeill (L), Spike McRoy (L), Michael Muehr, Steve Pate, Joey Sindelar, Heath Slocum, Hidemichi Tanaka, Phil Tataurangi
St. Louis, Missouri: Trevor Dodds, Tom Pernice Jr., Mario Tiziani (L)
Purchase, New York: Tom Byrum, Jason Caron (L), Jim Carter, K. J. Choi, Scott Dunlap, Harrison Frazar, David Frost, Kelly Gibson, Wayne Grady, Jay Haas, Per-Ulrik Johansson, Darrell Kestner (L), Taichiro Kiyota (a), Jeff Maggert, John Maginnes, Jim McGovern, Pat Perez, Jeev Milkha Singh, Craig Stadler, Paul Stankowski, Bob Tway, Jean van de Velde, Kaname Yokoo
Cincinnati, Ohio: Steve Flesch, Ian Leggatt, Todd Rose (L)
Aloha, Oregon: Ryan Moore (a,L)
Export, Pennsylvania: Charles Raulerson (L)
Houston, Texas: Andrew Sanders (L), Jimmy Walker

Alternates who gained entry
Felix Casas (Daly City) replaced Bruce Fleisher

(a) denotes amateur
(L) denotes player advanced through local qualifying

Past champions in the field

Made the cut

Missed the cut

Round summaries

First round
Thursday, June 13, 2002

Second round
Friday, June 14, 2002

Amateurs: Warrick (+9), Kiyota (+12), Barnes (+13), Moore (+15), Tolan (+26).

Third round
Saturday, June 15, 2002

Final round
Sunday, June 16, 2002

Amateurs: Warrick (+27)

Scorecard
Final round

Cumulative tournament scores, relative to par

Source:

References

External links
Full results
Coverage on the European Tour's official site

U.S. Open (golf)
Golf in New York (state)
Sports in Long Island
U.S. Open
U.S. Open (golf)
U.S. Open (golf)
U.S. Open (golf)